Jason Wehbe is a Lebanese international rugby footballer who most recently played rugby league for the Hills District Bulls. He was selected to represent Lebanon in the 2017 Rugby League World Cup.

Early career
He played for the Parramatta Eels in the Under 20s featuring former Parramatta players Junior Paulo and Semi Radradra.

Rugby union
Wehbe played rugby union for Panasonic Wild Knights in Japan's Top League.

References

External links
2017 RLWC profile

1992 births
Living people
Wehbe
Rugby league five-eighths
Saitama Wild Knights players
Australian rugby union players
Australian people of Lebanese descent
Australian rugby league players